James H. Clark (born October 10, 1952) is a former Republican member of the Pennsylvania House of Representatives.

References

Republican Party members of the Pennsylvania House of Representatives
Living people
1952 births
People from Montgomery County, Pennsylvania